Arthur Dunkel (26 August 1932 – 8 June 2005) was a Swiss (Portuguese-born) administrator. He served as director-general of General Agreement on Tariffs and Trade between 1980 and 1993. Dunkel was educated at the Graduate Institute of International Studies, in Geneva. He was Professor for international trade at the University of Fribourg (Switzerland).

Arthur Dunkel took an active part in the Uruguay Round Negotiations of the GATT. His contribution to the successful completion of these negotiations was vital. When negotiations had passed the deadline and no agreement had emerged he took initiative in his own hands compiling the 'Dunkel Draft' in December 1991. The draft put together the results of negotiations and provided an arbitrated solution to issues on which negotiators failed to agree. Even though the United States and India continued to bargain for changes to the Dunkel Draft, only minor amendments were made in the sphere of agriculture. The Dunkel Draft was accepted and became the foundation of the World Trade Organization.

1932 births
2005 deaths
General Agreement on Tariffs and Trade
Graduate Institute of International and Development Studies alumni
University of Lausanne alumni